La Brita Esperantisto is the official organ of the British Esperanto Association. It was launched as The British Esperantist (stylized as The British Esperantist.). It was published as a monthly and ran by a committee of editors from No. 1 issue (January 1905) to No. 306 (October 1930).

It continued as a monthly but with a frequency starting World War II as a bimonthly with joint issues covering two months (6 issues per year). 

In 1991 the publication became a quarterly and issued once every three months (4 issues a year). 

In the year 2000, the publication turned into a semi-annual issue (two issues titled Spring and Autumn). In 2010, it was retitled as LBE (abbreviation of La Brita Esperantisto), but it reverted to the title La Brita Esperantisto in 2015.

Editors included Montagu C. Butler, Wadham, K. Alexander, C. J. Hunt, Cecil C. Goldsmitt, G. Osmotherly, D. B. Gregor, A. E. Nobes, Edward Ockey, Dermond J. F. Quirke and William Auld, Paul Gubbins, Ian Carter and Tim Owen, the latter as editor in chief since Spring 2018 issue.

Editors

Notes
YouTube: Esperanto-gazetoj tra la tuta mondo: Okcidenta Eŭropo

References

Esperanto in the United Kingdom
Esperanto magazines
1905 establishments in the United Kingdom